The Journal of Sound and Vibration is a scientific journal in the field of acoustics. It is published by Elsevier. The journal is devoted to the prompt publication of original papers, both theoretical and experimental, that provide new information on any aspect of sound or vibration.

According to the Journal Citation Reports, the journal has a 2021 impact factor of 4.761.

External links
 Journal Homepage

References

Elsevier academic journals
Acoustics journals
Biweekly journals
Publications established in 1964